Divine freedom is the concept that God has free will.

One argument advanced against the concept of divine freedom is that it may contradict the principle of omnibenevolence, by limiting God's choices to only actions with perfectly good consequences.

According to saint Augustine of Hippo, since evil is absence of being and of perfection, the fact that God is the Highest does not limit His perfection, being, or freedom.

References

See also 
 Absence of good
 Argument from free will
 Euthyphro dilemma
 Modal collapse
 Perfection#Ontology and theology

Conceptions of God